Vaccinium ovatum is a North American species of flowering shrub known by the common names evergreen huckleberry, winter huckleberry, cynamoka berry and California huckleberry.

Distribution and ecology
Vaccinium ovatum is a small to medium-sized evergreen shrub native to the Western Pacific Coast of the United States and coastal British Columbia. Typical flora associates are such plants as the western sword fern (Polystichum munitum), coastal woodfern (Dryopteris arguta), California snowberry (Symphoricarpos mollis), common snowberry (Symphoricarpos albus), and thimbleberry (Rubus parviflorus). It is often found sprouting from nurse logs and growing in conjunction with red huckleberry (Vaccinium parvifolium).

Description
Vaccinium ovatum is a true huckleberry plant, growing well in shade or sun and thriving in acidic soils. Not needing much sun, the plant has a wide variety of forest homes; it is often seen sprouting out of old coast redwood stumps or dense brambles of other forest growths. The shiny, alternately arranged, egg-shaped leaves are 2 to 3 centimeters (0.8–1.2 inches) long and about a centimeter wide (0.4 inches) with finely serrated edges. During the summer the plant produces round, edible black berries up to a centimeter (0.4 inches) in diameter, which can remain on the branches until mid-winter. The berries are eaten by birds and mammals throughout autumn.

Uses

Culinary
Traditionally, huckleberries were sought after and collected by many Native American tribes along the Pacific coast in the region, including the Karok. The berries can be eaten raw and are said to taste similar to but sweeter and more intense than blueberries, and are a favorite ingredient in jams and jellies. Meriwether Lewis recorded that he observed indigenous people eating the berries raw, dried, and in bread, which preserved the fruit for a season.

Cultivation
Vaccinium ovatum is grown as an ornamental plant for horticultural use by specialty wholesale, retail, and botanic garden native plant nurseries. The plant is successful in natural landscape and native plant palette style, and habitat gardens and public sustainable landscape and restoration projects that are similar to its habitat conditions.

See also
Vaccinium parvifolium
California mixed evergreen forest
Huckleberry Botanic Regional Preserve

Gallery

References

Bibliography
 Stephen Foster and Christopher Hobbs. 2002. Western Medicinal Plants and Herbs (pg. 287).  Houghton Miller Company, New York, NY.

External links
 Calflora Database: Vaccinium ovatum (California huckleberry, evergreen huckleberry)
 Vaccinium ovatum — Calphotos Photo gallery, University of California

ovatum
Berries
Flora of the West Coast of the United States
Flora of British Columbia
Flora of California
Natural history of the California Coast Ranges
Natural history of the Peninsular Ranges
Natural history of the San Francisco Bay Area
Natural history of the Transverse Ranges
Plants described in 1813
Taxa named by Frederick Traugott Pursh
Fruits originating in North America
Plants used in Native American cuisine
Pre-Columbian California cuisine
Garden plants of North America
Bird food plants
Flora without expected TNC conservation status